Dutch supercentenarians are citizens, residents or emigrants from the Netherlands who have attained or surpassed 110 years of age. , the Gerontology Research Group (GRG) had validated the longevity claims of 27 Dutch supercentenarians. The oldest Dutch person ever was Hendrikje van Andel-Schipper, who lived 115 years, 62 days, from 1890 to 2005.

Oldest Dutch people ever
The list including known and validated supercentenarians who died before 2015 was compiled by the Gerontology Research Group (GRG). Later cases were sourced either from more recent GRG data, from administrative reports or from press coverage, as indicated in the table.

Notes

References

Dutch supercentenarians
Supercentenarians
Dutch